A permanently shadowed crater  is a depression on a body in the Solar System within which lies a point that is always in darkness.

As of 2019, there are 324 known permanently shadowed regions on the Moon. Such regions also exist on Mercury and Ceres.

Location 

Such a crater must be located at high latitude (close to a pole) and be on a body with very small axial tilt. The Moon has an axial tilt of about 1.5°; Mercury, 0.03°; and Ceres, about 4°.

On the Moon, permanent shadow can exist at latitudes as low as 58°; approximately 50 permanently shadowed regions exist in the 58°- 65° latitude range for both lunar hemispheres.

The cumulative area of permanently shadowed lunar regions is about 31 thousand km2; more than half of it is in the southern hemisphere.

Conditions inside craters 

Craters of eternal darkness might be advantageous for space exploration and colonization, as they preserve sources of water ice that can be converted into drinkable water, breathable oxygen, and rocket propellant. 
Several of such craters show indications of water ice in their interiors, including Rozhdestvenskiy and Cabeus craters on the Moon, and Juling Crater on Ceres. Other volatiles besides water can also be trapped in such craters, such as mercury. The LCROSS mission additionally found native silver and gold in permanently shadowed craters on the Moon, probably brought there by electrostatic dust transport, and some inconclusive evidence for platinum. Gold was estimated to have a soil mass abundance of 0.52% in these craters from LCROSS data, and mercury 0.39%. This high mercury abundance has been noted as a possible health hazard of water derived from permanently shadowed craters.

The craters may also contain unusually high concentrations of helium-3.

A business case analysis indicates that mining of propellants in the craters could become a profitable commercial enterprise.

In some cases, peaks of eternal light are located nearby, that could be advantageous for solar power generation. For example, there are two peaks near Shackleton Crater that are illuminated a combined ~94% of a lunar year.

Permanently shadowed regions have a stable surface temperature. On the Moon, the temperature hovers somewhere at or below 50 Kelvin. Another temperatures estimate is 25 K to 70 K. The low temperatures make the regions desirable locations for future infrared telescopes.

On the other hand, computer simulations show that powerful solar storms can charge up the soil in permanently shadowed regions near the lunar poles, and may possibly produce "sparks" that could vaporize and melt the soil.

There are other unique challenges of such regions: dark environments that restrict the ability of rovers to perceive their surroundings, cryogenic regolith that could be hard to move on, and communication interruptions.

Planetary protection 

In 2020, NASA assigned "sensitive location" status to the Moon's permanently shadowed regions to avoid their contamination.

List 

Below is an incomplete list of such craters:

The Moon:
 Shackleton
 Shoemaker
 Erlanger
 Sylvester
 Cabeus
 Rozhdestvenskiy
 Malapert

Mercury:
Chao Meng-Fu
Kandinsky
 Petronius
Prokofiev
Tolkien

Ceres:
Juling

Research missions

Past 
In 2009, LCROSS sent an impactor into a Cabeus crater, that resulted in detection of water in the ejected material.

In 2012, The Lyman Alpha Mapping Project aboard NASA's Lunar Reconnaissance Orbiter has found that the permanently shadowed regions have a porous, powdery surface, that indicates the presence of water ice.

In 2018, an analysis of the results of the Moon Mineralogy Mapper confirmed the existence of water ice deposits in permanently shadowed craters and crevices, with more abundance near the south pole.

Current 

Lunar Flashlight launched in December 2022 as a secondary payload for the Hakuto-R Mission 1 mission.

A camera called ShadowCam has been built that is able to take high-resolution images of Permanently Shadowed Regions. It is a NASA instrument that flies on board the Korea Pathfinder Lunar Orbiter (KPLO) since 2022.

Planned 

The proposed International Lunar Observatory mission involves a landing near the Malapert crater.

See also 
 Cold trap (astronomy)
 List of impact craters in Antarctica
 Peak of eternal light
 Lunar resources

References

External links
 Permanently Shadowed Regions Atlas
 Eternal Darkness Near the North Pole
 Eternal Darkness of Petronius Crater
 

Dynamics of the Solar System
Articles containing video clips
Geological features on the Moon